"Murder Ain't What it Used to Be!" is the seventh episode of the 1969 ITC British television series Randall and Hopkirk (Deceased) starring Mike Pratt, Kenneth Cope and Annette Andre. Directed by Jeremy Summers, the episode was first broadcast on 2 November 1969 on ITV.

Synopsis

Cast
Mike Pratt as Jeff Randall
Kenneth Cope as Marty Hopkirk
Annette Andre as Jeannie Hopkirk
Raymond Adamson ....  Jack Lacey
Joyce Carey ....  Mrs. Maddox
Patrick Connor ....  Harry
Sue Gerrard ....  Susan Kirstner
Alan Gifford ....  Paul Kirstner
David Healy ....  Bugsy Spanio
Charles Lamb ....  Hotel Porter

External links
http://www.anorakzone.com/randall

Randall and Hopkirk (Deceased) episodes
1969 British television episodes